(born January 14, 1981) is a Japanese actress and former gravure idol.

Personal life
Niiyama was born in Aomori, Aomori. She was previously married to baseball player . They have a daughter named  (born July 12, 2006). They divorced on December 29, 2014.  She is affiliated with Horipro.

Filmography

Film
The 2 Dimensional Travelers (1996)
Godzilla, Mothra and King Ghidorah: Giant Monsters All-Out Attack - Yuri Tachibana (2001)
Ju-on: The Grudge 2 - Tomoko Miura (2003)
Rokushukan Private Moment - Akira Yuki (2001)
Tokusou Sentai Dekaranger The Movie: Full Blast Action - Marie Gold/Deka Gold (2004)
Pride - Arimori (2009)
Keiji Shoot 4 - Honaka (2013)

Television
Carnation (2012)
Ultraman Taiga - Kana Sasaki (2019)
The Detective is Way Ahead - Sumika Sogawa (2018)

Voice Acting

Video game
Eurasia Express Satsujin Jiken - Yukino Wada (1998)
Doraemon: Nobita and the Robot Kingdom - Jeanne (2002)

References

External links
Official profile at Horipro
Official blog

1981 births
Living people
Voice actresses from Aomori Prefecture
People from Aomori (city)
Japanese gravure idols
Japanese voice actresses